Tirzah is an English singer-songwriter. Her first solo record, the EP I'm Not Dancing was released in 2013 on Greco-Roman. In 2014, she released the EP No Romance, followed by her single "Make It Up" in 2015. Her debut studio album, Devotion, was released in 2018 on Domino. Her second studio album Colourgrade was released on 1 October 2021, also on Domino.

Personal life
Tirzah was born in Braintree, Essex as the youngest of five children. After growing up playing Celtic Harp, she attended the Purcell School for Young Musicians with Mica Levi. She has two children (born 2018 and 2020) with musician Giles Kwakeulati King-Ashong, also known by his stage name Kwake Bass. They currently reside in Sidcup.

Discography

Studio albums

EPs
 I'm Not Dancing (2013)
 No Romance (2014)

Singles
 "I'm Not Dancing" (2013)
 "Malfunction (2014)
 "Make It Up" (2015) 
 "Gladly" (2018)
 "Obviously" (2018) (with Micachu as Taz & Meeks)
 "Affection" (2018)
 "Devotion" (2018) (feat. Coby Sey)
 "Send Me" (2021)
 "Sink In" (2021)
 "Tectonic" (2021) 
 "Hive Mind" (2021) (feat. Coby Sey)

Collaborative and featured tracks
 "Sun Down" (2014) (Tricky feat. Tirzah)
 "Silly Games" (2014) (Tricky feat. Tirzah)
 "Petals Have Fallen" (2014) (Dels feat. Tirzah)
 "Thinking of You" (2015) (Nozinja, Micachu, Tirzah and Mumdance)
 "Way from Me" (2016) (Baauer feat. Tirzah)
 "GO" (2016) (Micachu with Tirzah)
 "Dare You" (2016) (Micachu with Tirzah)
 "trip6love" (2016) (Micachu with Tirzah)
 "Obviously" (2018) (with Micachu as Taz & Meeks)
 "Today" (2020) (Mura Masa with Tirzah)
 "Le Malentendu" (2021) (Lafawndah, Lala &ce, Tirzah and Coby Sey)

Awards and nominations

References

Year of birth missing (living people)
Living people
English women pop singers
English women singer-songwriters
English women in electronic music
Musicians from London
Musicians from Essex
21st-century English women singers
21st-century English singers